Cape Mackintosh is a low, ice-covered cape forming the northern tip of Kemp Peninsula and the east entrance point to Mason Inlet, on the east coast of Palmer Land, Antarctica. It was probably first seen by members of the United States Antarctic Service who photographed a portion of Kemp Peninsula while exploring this coast from the air in December 1940. During 1947 the cape was photographed by the Ronne Antarctic Research Expedition, which in conjunction with the Falkland Islands Dependencies Survey (FIDS) surveyed it from the ground. The cape was named by the FIDS after Neil A. Mackintosh (1900–74), a British marine biologist, oceanographer, and authority on Antarctic whales. Mackintosh was a member of the Discovery Investigations scientific staff from 1924 and Chief Scientific Officer from 1929 to 1949; from 1949 to 1961 he was Deputy Director of the National Institute of Oceanography (later the Institute of Oceanographic Sciences).

References

Headlands of Palmer Land